Iceland participated in the Eurovision Song Contest 2000 with the song "Tell Me!" written by Örlygur Smári and Sigurður Örn Jónsson. The song was performed by August and Telma, which are the artistic names of singers Einar Ágúst Víðisson and Telma Ágústsdóttir. The Icelandic entry for the 2000 contest in Stockholm, Sweden was selected through the national final Söngvakeppni Sjónvarpsins 2000, organised by the Icelandic broadcaster Ríkisútvarpið (RÚV). Five songs competed in the selection which was held on 26 February 2000. "Hvert sem er" performed by Einar Ágúst Víðisson and Telma Ágústsdóttir emerged as the winner exclusively through public televoting. The song was later translated from Icelandic to English for the Eurovision Song Contest and was titled "Tell Me!".

Iceland competed in the Eurovision Song Contest which took place on 13 May 2000. Performing as the opening entry for the show in position 2, Iceland placed twelfth out of the 24 participating countries, scoring 45 points.

Background 

Prior to the 2000 Contest, Iceland had participated in the Eurovision Song Contest thirteen times since its first entry in 1986. Iceland's best placing in the contest to this point was second, which it achieved in 1999 with the song "All Out of Luck" performed by Selma. The Icelandic national broadcaster, Ríkisútvarpið (RÚV), broadcasts the event within Iceland and organises the selection process for the nation's entry. Between 1995 and 1999, Iceland opted to internally select their entry for the Eurovision Song Contest. For 2000, RÚV announced along with their participation confirmation that a national final would be used for the first time since 1994 to select the Icelandic entry.

Before Eurovision

Söngvakeppni Sjónvarpsins 2000 
Söngvakeppni Sjónvarpsins 2000 took place on 26 February 2000 at the RÚV studios in Reykjavík during the television programme Stutt í spun­ann, hosted by Hjálmar Hjálmarsson and Hera Björk Þórhallsdóttir, where five entries competed. The winner, "Hvert sem er" performed Einar Ágúst Víðisson and Telma Ágústsdóttir, was determined solely by televoting. The song was performed in English at the Eurovision Song Contest and was titled "Tell Me!".

At Eurovision 
According to Eurovision rules, all nations with the exceptions of the seven countries with the lowest average result in the past five contests competed in the final on 13 May 2000. Iceland was set to perform in position 12, following the entry from Cyprus and before the entry from Spain, and finished in twelfth place with 45 points.

The show was broadcast in Iceland on RÚV with commentary by Gísli Marteinn Baldursson. The Icelandic spokesperson, who announced the Icelandic votes during the show, was Ragnheiður Elín Clausen.

Voting 
Below is a breakdown of points awarded to Iceland and awarded by Iceland in the contest. The nation awarded its 12 points to Denmark in the contest.

References 

2000
Countries in the Eurovision Song Contest 2000
Eurovision